Hesham Salhe  (born 8 November 1987) is a Palestinian professional footballer who plays as a midfielder for Hilal Al-Quds.

External links

References

1987 births
Living people
Palestinian footballers
Hilal Al-Quds Club players
Palestine international footballers
Association football midfielders
2015 AFC Asian Cup players
People from Gaza City